Johan Mikael Jakobsson (born 12 February 1987) is a Swedish handball player for IK Sävehof and for the Swedish national team. From 2014 to 2017 he played for german top team SG Flensburg-Handewitt.

Jakobsson participated in the 2009 World Championship, the 2010 European Championship, as a stand-in for Kim Andersson in the 2011 World Championship, and the 2012 European Championship and 2012 Olympic Games, where Sweden won the silver medal.

Individual awards
All-Star Right back of the European Championship: 2016

References

External links
Johan Jakobsson  on Aalborg Håndbold's webpage
Johan Jakobsson on SG Flensburg-Handewitt's webpage
Johan Jakobsson in the EHF Champions League database

Swedish male handball players
Handball players from Gothenburg
Living people
1987 births
Handball players at the 2012 Summer Olympics
Handball players at the 2016 Summer Olympics
Olympic handball players of Sweden
Olympic silver medalists for Sweden
Olympic medalists in handball
Medalists at the 2012 Summer Olympics
IK Sävehof players
Aalborg Håndbold players
SG Flensburg-Handewitt players
Expatriate handball players
Handball-Bundesliga players
Swedish expatriate sportspeople in Denmark
Swedish expatriate sportspeople in Germany